Teodulfo Sabugal Domingo (September 5, 1910 - June 3, 2002) was a Filipino prelate of the Catholic Church in the Philippines. He was the fifth Bishop of Tuguegarao and first Archbishop of Tuguegarao when then diocese of Tuguegarao was elevated as an archdiocese by Pope Paul VI in September 21, 1974. He was the first Cagayano to be consecrated as bishop and the longest serving ordinary of Tuguegarao to date.

Biography
Archbishop Teodulfo S. Domingo was born in San Jose, Baggao, Cagayan on September 5, 1910. For his priestly formation, he first studied at the San Jacinto Seminary and later in the Immaculate Conception School of Theology (ICST), which was run by the SVD fathers at that time. He was ordained to the priesthood by Bishop Constant J. Jurgens, CICM on April 3, 1938.

He is the first Cagayano in history to be consecrated as bishop. He was consecrated bishop on July 2, 1957, at the St. Peter Cathedral by then Apostolic Nuncio to the Philippines Archbishop Egidio Vagnozzi, as principal consecrator. Acting as co-consecrators were Bishop Alejandro A. Olalia of Lipa (previously Bishop of Tuguegarao) and Bishop Peregrin de la Fuente, OP of the Prelature of Batanes and the Babuyan Islands (now Prelature of Batanes). He was also installed as the Fifth Bishop of Tuguegarao.

He was a delegate during the Second Vatican Council (1962–65) and he attended all of the sessions. On September 21, 1974, he was appointed as the first Archbishop of Tuguegarao following the elevation of the diocese of Tuguegarao as an Archdiocese on September 21, 1974.

On January 31, 1986, John Paul II accepted Domingo's resignation, ending the reign of the first Archbishop of the Archdiocese of Tuguegarao, the longest serving prelate of Tuguegarao (1957-1974 as Bishop of Tuguegarao, 1974-1986 as Archbishop of Tuguegarao) up to this date. That same day, he was succeeded by his Auxiliary Bishop Diosdado A. Talamayan as the Second Archbishop of Tuguegarao. He died on June 3, 2002, in Villa Domingo, Solana, Cagayan at the age of 91.

Coat of Arms

The coat of arms of the Archdiocese of Tuguegarao appears on the left side of the viewer while that of Archbishop Domingo appears on the right. The Bishop's chosen motto is "Ad Nutum Reginae", meaning "At the Good Pleasure of the Queen."

References

External links

 
Eclesiastico de Filipinas ; Volume 31, año XXXV, number 349 (July 1957)

1910 births
2002 deaths
People from Tuguegarao
Bishops appointed by Pope Pius XII
Roman Catholic bishops of Tuguegarao
Roman Catholic archbishops of Tuguegarao
Filipino Roman Catholics